Matsumi "Mike" Kanemitsu (May 28, 1922- May 11, 1992) was a Japanese-American painter who was also proficient in Japanese style sumi and lithography.

Kanemitsu was born to Japanese parents in Ogden, Utah on May 28, 1922.  At age three, he was taken to Japan and grew up in a suburb of Hiroshima with his grandparents.  He returned to the United States in 1940 and enlisted in the United States Army in 1941 at Fort Douglas, at which point he renounced his Japanese citizenship and became solely an American citizen. He was arrested after the attack on Pearl Harbor, and interned. While interned, he began drawing with supplies provided by the American Red Cross. After his release, Kanemitsu enlisted in the Army and served as a hospital assistant in Europe. In 1946, he was discharged from the Army and undertook formal art education with Fernand Léger in Paris, with Karl Metzler in Baltimore, and with Yasuo Kuniyoshi at the Art Students League of New York beginning in 1951. Among the jobs he took to support himself while in art school was a position as director of entertainment in a Baltimore gambling hall, where he oversaw the striptease dancers. While at the Art Students League he associated with artists such as Paul Jenkins, Warren Brandt, Jackson Pollock, Lee Krasner, Robert Motherwell, Willem and Elaine de Kooning, and others. By 1958 he was firmly entrenched in abstract expressionism and was close with Norman Bluhm. In the 1950s and early 60s he received two Longview Foundation awards and a Ford Foundation Fellowship to practice lithography at the Tamarind Lithography Workshop in Los Angeles. He moved to Los Angeles in 1961, in part due to his dislike of the rise of Pop Art in New York, and was on the faculty of Chouinard Art Institute from 1965 to 1970, California Institute of the Arts from 1970 to 1971,  and the Otis College of Art and Design from 1971 to 1983. In 1990, along with fellow artist Nancy Uyemura and two dealers from Japan, he opened Gallery IV, which showed both local Los Angeles artists and Japanese artists. Kanemitsu died of lung cancer at his home in Los Angeles on May 11, 1992.

In 2018, Kanemitsu's former home at 800 Traction Avenue in Los Angeles was set to be landmarked by the city, but controversy erupted over the erasure of its history as the home of a number of Japanese-American artists, including Kanemitsu.

Though he painted representational works in the early 1950s, Kanemitsu is generally considered a second-generation abstract expressionist.  Later in the 1950s, with the support of Frank O'Hara and Harold Rosenberg, he was able to show his work at the Museum of Modern Art, the Whitney Museum, and the Radich Gallery. He is best known for his non-objective paintings, which are often hard-edge, such as Landscape, from 1967, in the collection of the Honolulu Museum of Art.

Public Collections 

 Baltimore Museum of Art 
 Corcoran Gallery of Art (Washington, D.C.)
 Hiroshima City Museum of Contemporary Art 
 Honolulu Museum of Art 
 Los Angeles County Museum of Art 
 Metropolitan Museum of Art 
 Museum of Modern Art (New York City) 
 National Gallery of Art (Washington, D.C.) 
 National Museum of Modern Art, Tokyo
 Philadelphia Museum of Art
 San Francisco Museum of Modern Art

References
 Brown, Michael D., Views from Asian California 1920–1965, An Illustrated History, San Francisco, Michael D. Brown, 1992 
 Yamaki Art Gallery, Matsumi Kanemitsu Lithographs 1961–1990, Osaka, Yamaki Art Gallery, 1990 
 Japanese American Cultural and Community Center, Matsumi Kanemitsu, Works in Black and White, 1958–1988, Los Angeles, Japanese American Cultural and Community Center, 1988 
 Nordland, Gerald, Matsumi Kanemitsu (1922-1992) A Retrospective, Beverly Hills Louis Newman Galleries, 1993 
 Uyemura, Nancy, "Portrait of an Artist", Tozai Times, issue 51, December 1988

Footnotes

External links 

 Matsumi Kanemitsu website via Louis Stern Fine Arts: https://www.matsumikanemitsu.com/
 Matsumi Kanemitsu on ArtNet: http://www.artnet.com/artists/matsumi-kanemitsu/
 Matsumi Kanemitsu at the Smithsonian American Art Museum: https://americanart.si.edu/artist/matsumi-kanemitsu-2540

20th-century American painters
Modern painters
American artists of Japanese descent
Artists from Ogden, Utah
20th-century American printmakers
1922 births
1992 deaths
American expatriates in Japan
United States Army personnel of World War II